Usnea mutabilis is a grayish-yellowish pale green, unequally branching, shrubby (fruticose) 3–7 cm long lichen commonly anchored on holdfasts on trees, mostly in eastern North America, sometimes in chaparral shrubs or pines in California. It is darker green than other members of the genus Usnea. The surface is covered with isolated, or clusters of, isidia. It lacks apothecia.

The common name is bloody beard lichen. The thick axis and medulla are dull red.

References

mutabilis
Lichen species
Lichens of North America
Lichens described in 1881
Taxa named by James Stirton